Graf Ignatievo is a village in Maritsa Municipality, southern Bulgaria. As of 2006 it has 2015 inhabitants. The village is named after a Russian diplomat- Count Nikolai Pavlovich Ignatiev, who played an important role as an ambassador of Russia in Istanbul for the conclusion of the Treaty of San Stefano that called for the creation of Greater Bulgaria. There is the major military Graf Ignatievo Air Base of great importance used by the Bulgarian Air Force and the US.

External links 
 Official webside of the airbase 
 Several Videoclips
 More video
 Literature

Villages in Maritsa Municipality